The men's bantamweight (54 kg/118.8 lbs) Low-Kick division at the W.A.K.O. European Championships 2006 in Skopje was the second lightest of the male Low-Kick tournaments and was one of the smallest involving just four fighters.  Each of the matches was three rounds of two minutes each and were fought under Low-Kick kickboxing rules.

The tournament gold medal position was won by Jordan Vasilev from Bulgaria who defeated Emil Karimov from Azerbaijan in the final by split decision.  Defeated semi finalists, Boban Marinkovic and Mokhmad Betmirzaev from Serbia and Russia respectively, won bronze medals for their efforts.

Results

Key

See also
List of WAKO Amateur European Championships
List of WAKO Amateur World Championships
List of male kickboxers

References

External links
 WAKO World Association of Kickboxing Organizations Official Site

W.A.K.O. European Championships 2006 (Skopje)